The Daily Item is the name of the following American newspapers:

 The Daily Item (Clinton), a former newspaper in Clinton, Massachusetts
 The Daily Item (Lynn), Lynn, Massachusetts
 The Wakefield Daily Item, Wakefield, Massachusetts
 The Daily Item (Port Chester), Port Chester, New York
 The Daily Item (Sunbury), Sunbury, Pennsylvania
 The Daily Item (Sumter), Sumter, South Carolina